The twelfth season of American Idol premiered on January 16, 2013, as part of the mid-season of the 2012–13 network television season. Ryan Seacrest returned to host. Randy Jackson returned for his twelfth season as judge and was joined by new judges Mariah Carey, Nicki Minaj, and Keith Urban, who replaced Jennifer Lopez and Steven Tyler.

The season was the third to have four judges, after the eighth and ninth seasons. It was also the first season in the show's history where all the finalists of one gender (male) were eliminated before any finalists of the opposite gender, thus making it the first to not only have an all-female top 5, but also the first season since the sixth to produce a female winner, as well as the first season since the third to have a finale consisting of two women. It was also the first season where the judges did not use the "Judges' Save" since its introduction in the eighth season. This was the third season where both finalists were in the bottom three or two at some point in the competition.

On May 16, 2013, Candice Glover was announced the winner of the twelfth season of American Idol, making Kree Harrison the runner-up. Glover also became the third African-American female behind Fantasia Barrino and Jordin Sparks to win the show. Glover was also the last female contestant to win the competition in the show's run on Fox. In a series first, Glover's debut album, Music Speaks, was available for pre-order immediately following the finale broadcast. This was the only season to feature Carey and Minaj as judges, who both decided to leave the show in May 2013 to focus on their music careers.

Show changes
After a sharp drop in ratings during the eleventh season, Fox entertainment president Kevin Reilly announced that the show would undergo "some creative tweaking" for the following season. After two seasons, judges Steven Tyler and Jennifer Lopez announced their exits from the series on July 12 and 13, 2012, respectively. On July 23, Mariah Carey was announced as a judge for the twelfth season. On September 16, returning judge Randy Jackson and new hires Nicki Minaj and Keith Urban were confirmed to be serving on the panel. On December 31, 2012, it was announced that Ryan Seacrest has signed on to remain the host for at least two more seasons.

Producer Nigel Lythgoe indicated on January 9, 2013, that during the Hollywood rounds, the girls and boys would perform on separate weeks. Each gender would have equal number of eliminations right up until the Top 10 live shows. He also announced that there will be no wild cards, instead replacing a brand new "Sudden death" round in which the top 40 already had to perform in front of a live audience, then the judges picked five out of the ten contestants per show to proceed to the top 20. The number of finalists was limited to ten which last occurred in the inaugural season.

This season also introduced the SuperVote where viewers were able to cast fifty votes at once online or through the new American Idol App, in addition to all the regular voting methods. Voters are able to allocate any number of votes for one contestant or multiple contestants, for a total of fifty votes, across all online voting destinations.

This season also showcased an "Idol Update" segment by bringing back many Idol alumni to perform on the result shows or as a guest in the audience. Such performers were Kelly Clarkson, Clay Aiken, Fantasia Barrino, Jennifer Hudson, Carrie Underwood, Katharine McPhee, David Cook, Adam Lambert, Lee DeWyze, Scotty McCreery, Lauren Alaina, Phillip Phillips, Jordin Sparks, Colton Dixon and Jessica Sanchez. In addition, three former judges made appearances on this season. Paula Abdul returned to the show briefly on the Top 5 result night, Tyler appeared dressed up posing as a contestant during the audition rounds and Lopez performed the night of the finale.

Regional auditions
In an attempt to refresh the show's audition process, new ways to audition were announced. 
First is the "American Idol Small Town Audition Bus Tour", a ten town nationwide tour that will give hopefuls who couldn't make it to one of the large audition cities a chance to try out. The cities are Idaho Falls, Idaho; Billings, Montana; Casper, Wyoming; Rock Rapids, Iowa; Iowa City, Iowa; Bowling Green, Kentucky; Clarksdale, Mississippi; Joplin, Missouri; Dodge City, Kansas and Grand Junction, Colorado. Idol is also starting the "Nominate an Idol" program, which will let friends and family of individuals they think could be the next American Idol nominate said person in secret by filling out an online form and existing video or URL of their nominee—they must be singing solo and a cappella. The chosen auditions will then be surprised on location by a film crew and given an opportunity to advance to the next round. Finally, online auditions for season 12 were open from August 1 to 14, 2012, and October 12 to November 4, 2012.
Auditions took place in the following cities:

 The number for San Antonio audition was not revealed and this is the number of contestants from that city profiled in American Idol official website, and may not represent the true number.

Hollywood week
For the first time, the Hollywood rounds were held in the Valley Performance Arts Center in Northridge, California. The contestants were separated by gender, with the male contestants performing in the first week, and the female the next.  There were three rounds in each week – the a cappella, the group, and the solo rounds. Unlike previous seasons, the groups in the group round were chosen by the producers, although each group was able to select a song from a list of twenty songs to perform. The males performed February 6 and 7 and the females performed February 13 and 14. The contestants sang a cappella solos in groups of eight and the judges chose only a few of them to move on to group round that same night and for the first time, the producers picked the groups. On the second night, the contestants performed solos. They were then divided into groups of eight, and only a few of them moved on. The judges picked 20 males and 20 females to perform in front of a live studio audience at The Beatles Love by Cirque De Soleil at The Mirage. Five were eliminated, while five advanced.

Vegas semifinal rounds
The semi-finals round took place at The Beatles Love by Cirque De Soleil at The Mirage.  The forty people who made it then faced the "sudden death" Las Vegas round and only twenty moved on. The contestants were divided into four gender-separated groups of ten, with the female groups airing on Wednesdays and the male groups airing on Thursdays between February 20 and 28. Each group performed in front of the judges and a studio audience, singing a standard ninety-second solo with the judges critiquing them at the end. After all the performances had done, they were called out one at a time, to face the judges, who in turn, decide whether to move on to the second semi-finals round or send home.

Color key:

Group 1

Group 2

Semi-finalists

The following is a list of Top 20 semi-finalists who failed to reach the finals:

Semi-finals
The Top 20 semi-finals continued at The Beatles Love stage in Las Vegas. The three-night event marked the first week viewers were allowed to cast votes. The females performed on the first night and the males thereafter the second night; on the third night, the show moved back to Los Angeles and only five contestants per each gender were announced on who will advance and who were eliminated. A new format was introduced for the revealing of the results: Seacrest walked backstage into the green room and, one by one, announced the contestant who would advance to the finals. The live studio audience and judges were not aware on the results until the contestants walked out on stage. Each of them sang their victory song. After the results were announced, Seacrest revealed that there will be a sing-off next week during the finals between the sixth placing male and female contestant who did not make the top ten. They would compete to join the American Idol tour.

Color key:

Semi-finals

Cleland and Askew did qualify for the Sing-off, but, like the other four semi-finalists from each respective gender group who failed to reach the finals and were eliminated, did not compete in the finals.

Victory songs

Finals
In this season, there were ten weeks of the finals and ten finalists, with one finalist eliminated per week based on the American public's votes (exception includes the Top 4-non-elimination week). Previous season's winner Phillip Phillips recorded the song "Gone, Gone, Gone" as the song played during the contestant's montage. Jimmy Iovine reprised his role as a weekly mentor to the contestants, frequently assisted by guest mentors.

Color key:

Top 10 – Music of the American Idols
The contestants performed a song that a previous American Idol winner performed while on the show, including their winning singles, or a song they recorded in their post-Idol career.

American Idol tour 2013 Fan Save
Before the results were announced, two more acts who finished sixth in the semi-finals rounds for the respective gender, Aubrey Cleland and Charlie Askew, were presented on the Top 10 results show, both vying for an 11th place in the Idol tour 2013. The results were announced the next episode, which Cleland won.

Top 9 – The Beatles
The contestants performed a song from the hit band The Beatles.

Top 8 – Music of Motor City
The contestants sang songs with performers composed in Detroit. Duets and trios were also introduced during this week. Smokey Robinson served as the week's guest mentor.

Top 7 – Rock
The contestants sang songs within the rock genre; a caveat was added that ballads were off-limits this week.

Top 6 – Burt Bacharach and Hal David / Songs They Wish They'd Written
Contestants performed two songs, one song which was composed by either Burt Bacharach or Hal David, and one song which they would have liked to write about. With the elimination of Arbos, this was the first (and to date, the only) season in American Idol history in which all of the contestants of one gender were voted off before anyone of the opposite gender, thus this also became the second season since season three to guarantee an all-female finale, and the first female winner since season six.

Top 5 – Year They Were Born / Divas
The top 5 rounds marked the final week where the judges can exercise their "Save"; Arthur was eliminated during the result show while the Save is still valid, making it the first (and to date, the only) time since the introduction in season eight the Save is forfeited without ever using it.

Top 4 (first week) – Contestant's Choice / One-Hit Wonders
The second song performed this week, One-Hit Wonders, was selected by the viewers.

Top 4 (second week) – Songs from Now and Then
Each contestant performed a hit song of 2013 and a song from the Great American Songbook standards. Harry Connick, Jr. served as the week's mentor. With the previous week's being non-elimination, votes were accumulative on both last week and this week shows and the contestant receiving a lower count of votes at the end of this round was eliminated.

Top 3 – Jimmy Iovine's Choice / Judges' Choice / Producers' Choice
Each contestant performed a song chosen by mentor Jimmy Iovine, the judges and the producers.

Top 2 – Simon Fuller's Choice / Winner's Single / Favorite Performance 
Each contestant performed a song chosen by creator Simon Fuller, their debut single and a reprisal of one of their previous favorites.

Elimination chart

Color key:

Results show performances

Finalists
All of season 12's finalists participated in the American Idols LIVE! Tour 2013. Semifinalist Aubrey Cleland participated in the tour.

Candice Glover (born November 22, 1989) is from Beaufort, South Carolina. She lives in St. Helena Island, South Carolina. She auditioned in Charlotte, singing "Syrup & Honey". She previously auditioned in the ninth and eleventh seasons, where she made it to the Las Vegas round during the eleventh season and grouped with that season's finalists DeAndre Brackensick and Jessica Sanchez. She performed Alicia Keys's "Girl on Fire" in her final solo in the Hollywood rounds. Glover performed "(You Make Me Feel Like) A Natural Woman" at the sudden death round which received high praises from the judges. She performed "Ordinary People" at the semi-finals. At Top 6 Week Glover performed "Lovesong" her performance earned high praise and was called the best performance in the show's history. Her musical influences are Christina Aguilera and Jazmine Sullivan. Glover was announced as the winner on May 16. Her debut album, Music Speaks was released on February 17, 2014.

Kree Harrison (born May 17, 1990) is from Woodville, Texas, but lives in Nashville. She auditioned in Oklahoma City. Her father died in an airplane crash when she was 12, and her mother died in a car accident after Kree turned 19. She also signed a deal with Lyric Street Records when she was twelve but was dropped after creative differences. She has also had a song publishing deal. She performed "Sin Wagon" at the group round in Hollywood. Harrison performed "Stars" as her final solo in the Hollywood rounds which received praises from the judges. Then, she sang "Up to the Mountain (MLK song)" in the sudden death rounds. She sang "Stronger" at the semi-finals. She stated that her musical influence is her family. Harrison was the runner-up.

Angie Miller (born February 17, 1994) is from Beverly, Massachusetts. She auditioned in New York City singing "Mamma Knows Best." She stated at her audition that she is partially deaf, with twenty percent hearing loss in her right ear and forty percent in her left ear. Prior to auditioning for American Idol Miller established a successful YouTube channel gaining over 3.7 million views. Miller performed her original composition "You Set Me Free" for her final solo in the Hollywood rounds receiving standing ovation from the judges. She sang Jessie J's "Nobody's Perfect" at the Vegas sudden death rounds and she sang "Never Gone" at the semi-finals. Her personal musical influences are Jessie J and Beyoncé Knowles. Miller was eliminated on May 9 coming in third place. Prior to her elimination, Miller had never been in the bottom group. During the season finale, she sang a duet with her idol Jessie J, singing "Domino". After the performance Jessie J invited her to go on tour in Europe with her to perform her original song "You Set Me Free". "You Set Me Free" was also released on iTunes the night of the season finale.

Amber Holcomb (born March 17, 1994) is from Houston. She originally auditioned in the eleventh season, but was cut in the Las Vegas round, where she grouped with Curtis along with the eleventh season finalists Shannon Magrane and Joshua Ledet. She performed "My Funny Valentine" in Vegas sudden death rounds which received standing ovation from the judges. Holcomb performed "I Believe in You and Me" at the semi-final voting round receiving standing ovation from all of the judges. Prior to Idol, she graduated from Dekaney High School in 2012. Her musical influences are Celine Dion, Karen Carpenter and Whitney Houston. Holcomb was eliminated on May 2 coming in fourth place.

Janelle Arthur (born December 12, 1989) is from Oliver Springs, Tennessee. She auditioned in Charlotte, where she sang "Where the Blacktop Ends". She has auditioned twice before, in seasons the tenth and eleventh seasons. In the tenth season, she was cut in the group round, and in the eleventh season she made it to the Las Vegas round. Arthur performed "I Told You So" at the Hollywood rounds. Then, she performed "Just a Kiss" at the Vegas sudden death rounds. She sang "If I Can Dream" at the semi-final round. Prior to Idol, Arthur was a Zumba instructor. Her musical influences are Vince Gill and Eva Cassidy. After singing, "When I Call Your Name" and "Dumb Blonde", Arthur was eliminated on April 18 coming in fifth place.

Lazaro Arbos (born December 27, 1990) is originally from Cuba but has lived in Naples, Florida, since he was ten years old. He auditioned in Chicago, where he sang "Bridge over Troubled Water". He sang "The Edge of Glory" at the Hollywood rounds as his final solo. Arbos performed "Tonight I Wanna Cry" at the Vegas sudden death rounds. He performed "Feeling Good" at the semi-finals. When Lazaro was six, he began stuttering to the point where he could barely talk. He has gone through speech and language therapy, but it never improved his stutter. His musical influence is Selena. He was eliminated on April 11 coming in sixth place. 

Burnell Taylor (born April 14, 1993) is from New Orleans. He auditioned in Baton Rouge, singing "I'm Here" which received standing ovation from the judges. He sang "Jar of Hearts" at the Hollywood rounds. Taylor performed "This Time" at the Vegas sudden death rounds. He also performed the same song at the semi-finals. He stated in his audition that he and his family were survivors of Hurricane Katrina. His musical influence is India.Arie. After his performance of "You Give Love a Bad Name", he was eliminated on April 4 coming in seventh place.

Devin Velez (born April 22, 1994) is from Chicago. He auditioned in Chicago as well. Velez sang "What a Wonderful World" at the Hollywood rounds. Then, he sang "Listen" at the sudden death rounds. Velez performed "Somos Novios (It's Impossible)" at the semi-final round. He draws his musical influences from artists including Israel Houghton, Cece Winans, Smokie Norful, Donnie McClurkin, Beyoncé Knowles, and his mother. After his performance of "The Tracks of My Tears", he was eliminated on March 28 coming in eighth place.

Paul Jolley (born January 27, 1990) is from Palmersville, Tennessee. He auditioned in Baton Rouge, singing "I Won't Let Go". He sang Carrie Underwood's "Blown Away" at the Hollywood rounds. He sang "Tonight I Wanna Cry" at the Vegas sudden death rounds. Jolley performed "Just a Fool" at the semi-final round. His musical style came from his family. He dubbed himself as the male version of Carrie Underwood. After his performance of "Eleanor Rigby", he was eliminated on March 21 coming in ninth place.

Curtis Finch, Jr. (born August 19, 1988) is from St. Louis, Missouri. He has previously auditioned in the fourth and eleventh seasons, where he made it to the Las Vegas round, where he grouped with Amber along with eleventh season finalists Shannon Magrane and Joshua Ledet. He had performed "Jar of Hearts" as his final solo in the Hollywood rounds. Finch sang "Superstar" at the sudden death rounds. He performed "I Believe I Can Fly" at the semi-final round. His personal musical style is his gospel background. He was the first finalist eliminated on March 14 coming in tenth place.

Mariah Carey–Nicki Minaj feud
A video was leaked to TMZ in October 2012 which showed Minaj erupting in a tirade against Carey during the audition in Charlotte, North Carolina. It was also claimed that Minaj was heard saying off-camera, "If I had a gun, I would shoot that bitch."  Minaj however denied that she had made the threat.  Ryan Seacrest said that the dispute "went a little too far", while Keith Urban jokingly said "I was the UN", and the feud elicited a comment from President Barack Obama that Carey and Minaj will "sort it out". In an interview with Barbara Walters on The View aired on January 7, 2013, Carey said that, due to Minaj's threats, it "felt like an unsafe work environment," and claimed that she had boosted her personal security. Minaj has stated that Barbara Walters never attempted to contact her for comment regarding her side of the story. Carey also said that she has since made up with Minaj. Carey's then-husband Nick Cannon claimed that the feud was used by American Idol producers to generate interest and ratings. Producer Nigel Lythgoe however denied that he was responsible for leaking the video or that it was a publicity stunt, and said that he had no plans to use the footage in advance of or during the season.  Fox executive Mike Darnell described the buzz due to the feud as being great. The aired episode of the Charlotte audition did not show the tirade and what was shown  appeared to have no real linear connection with the leaked footage.

In April 2013, Carey noted during an episode of American Idol that Minaj had not had a number-one song on the US Billboard Hot 100. The next day, Minaj took to Twitter to post what have been described as "extremely harsh" insults against Carey. She labeled the singer "insecure" and "bitter", while also referencing a widely spread rumor that the producers of American Idol wanted to bring Jennifer Lopez back to the panel after a significant decline in ratings this season; "All dem #1s but JLo phone ringin? Lol. I guess having a personality, being a secure woman, and giving genuine critique still trumps that", Minaj tweeted. In November 2013, Carey stated that "American Idol was like going to work every day in hell with Satan".

U.S. Nielsen ratings
The Wednesday episodes had an average viewer number of 15.04 million with a 4.6 rating in the 18/49 demo, while the Thursday episodes had an average viewer number of 14.64 million and a 4.3 in 18/49 demo. The average figure represents a 23% drop from the previous year.

References

American Idol seasons
2013 American television seasons